The Income Tax Assessment Act 1997 (Cth) is an Act of the Parliament of Australia introduced by the Howard government. The Act is one of a few statutes used in Australia to calculate income tax assessments. The Act was passed in an attempt to provide a rewritten income tax assessment statute, as the Income Tax Assessment Act 1936 was considered outdated. New matters relating to Australian income tax law are generally added to the Act, rather than the old 1936 Act.

Background

The Act 
Issues addressed by the act include:

 Deductions for expenses incurred earning assessed income - s8(1)
 Deductions for management of tax affairs - s25(5)
 The definition of 'trading stock', including shares - s70(10)
 The capital gains tax
 A ban on deductions for expenses relating to illegally earned income - s26(54)

Legacy

See also 
 Taxation in Australia
 Income tax in Australia
 Commissioner of Taxation v La Rosa

Footnotes

References

External links 

Income Tax Assessment Act 1997 at ComLaw
Income Tax Assessment Act 1997 at SCALEplus

Acts of the Parliament of Australia
1997 in Australian law
Income tax in Australia